Carbonero may refer to:

Carbonero, another name for the bar jack, a fish
Carbonero el Mayor, a municipality in the province of Segovia, Castile and León, Spain
Sara Carbonero (born 1984), Spanish sports journalist

See also
Carboneros, a city in the province of Jaén, Spain
Carbonera (disambiguation)
Carbonara (disambiguation)
Carbonari, secret revolutionary societies in Italy circa 1800–1831
Carbonaro (disambiguation)